"All About It" is a hip-hop song by American rapper Hoodie Allen. It features vocals from Ed Sheeran. The song was recorded for Allen's first album, People Keep Talking (2014). On October 13, 2014, it became available on streaming and downloading services.

Charts

Certifications

Release history

References

2014 songs
Ed Sheeran songs
2014 singles
2015 singles
Songs written by Ed Sheeran